"Fairytale" is a song written and performed by Belarusian-Norwegian violinist and singer Alexander Rybak. It is the first single from his debut album Fairytales. The song was the winner of the Eurovision Song Contest 2009, where he represented Norway.

Writing and inspiration
In February 2009, Norwegian media reported that "Fairytale" is about Rybak's ex-girlfriend Ingrid Berg Mehus whom he got to know through the Barratt Due Institute of Music in Oslo. Rybak has since confirmed this. At a press conference in May 2009 he revealed that the song's inspiration came from the Hulder, a beautiful female creature from Scandinavian folklore, who lures young men to her, and then may curse them for all time. The Russian-language version of the song is entitled "Skazka".

Eurovision 2009
The song was elected through the Norwegian festival Melodi Grand Prix 2009 on 21 February, winning in the biggest landslide of the contest's history, and competed against eighteen other Eurovision entries in the second semi-final on 14 May 2009, where it qualified for the final. The final took place on 16 May and the song won with 387 points – a new ESC record. It was 's third Eurovision win.

The backing dancers for the Eurovision performance, Sigbjørn Rua, Torkjell Lunde Børsheim and Hallgrim Hansegård, are from the Norwegian dance company Frikar, performing the folk dance halling.
The backing singers, Jorunn Hauge and Karianne Kjærnes, wore long pink dresses designed by Norwegian designer Leila Hafzi.

Music video
The first official music video for the song, which was used to present the song before the Eurovision final, was Alexander Rybak's performance at the Melodi Grand Prix 2009 in Norway. The most recent video was of Rybak playing the violin and singing with his backing dancers behind him, where the background occasionally changes from white to black.

A video of Rybak's performance of the song at the Eurovision Song Contest final was chosen by YouTube as one of its 31 most memorable videos of 2009.

Record
In the Norwegian preselection, Melodi Grand Prix 2009, Rybak's "Fairytale" won with a combined televote and jury score of 747,888, in the biggest victory of the contest's history. The song received over 600,000 votes more than the runner-up, which made it the clearest win in the history of Melodi Grand Prix.

At the Eurovision Song Contest 2009, Rybak won with the highest recorded score since the contest began, with 387 points (out of a maximum possible of 492), surpassing Lordi's  record of 292. He held this record until  when Jamala from Ukraine, the first self-written winner after Rybak, won with a record 534 points (but because of the new scoring system with separate sets of televotes and jury votes, the results are not comparable with each other). His average score of 9.4 points from every voting nation was the highest since the wide use of televoting began in 1998.

Commercial performance
The song also debuted on the Norwegian Singles Chart on the week of 11 February 2009 at number 3, before rising to number one on the following week, the week of the Melodi Grand Prix final. This was the first time that the Melodi Grand Prix winner reached number 1 before winning the contest. The song remained at number 1 for 8 consecutive weeks. The song has since entered the Swedish Sverigetopplistan, debuting at number 47, before rising to number 7 in its third week, the week of Eurovision - eventually reaching the top spot. After the song gaining the Top Spot on Eurovision, it entered the Top Ten of many Charts across Europe, and also the No. 1 position in many countries. The song debuted on the UK charts at #10 on Downloads Alone and then dropped to #38 the next week, it also reached Number 3 on the Download Chart. "Fairytale" is the ninth non-UK Eurovision entry to reach the top ten in the UK charts since the contest began in 1956, most recently Johnny Logan reached #2 representing  in 1987. It was certified Gold in Finland and Norway. The single went multi-platinum in different formats in Russia. It first went platinum as realtone full track and sold 100,000 copies. Then it was certified 2× platinum as ring-back tone with another 400,000 copies sold.
Combined sales of the song are 500,000 copies without online downloads.

Charts

Weekly charts

Year-end charts

Certifications

Release history

References

External links

 Alexander Rybak - "Fairytale" at the official Eurovision Song Contest channel on YouTube

Alexander Rybak songs
Eurovision songs of 2009
Eurovision songs of Norway
Ultratop 50 Singles (Flanders) number-one singles
Number-one singles in Denmark
Number-one singles in Finland
Number-one singles in Iceland
Number-one singles in Norway
Number-one singles in Russia
Number-one singles in Sweden
Eurovision Song Contest winning songs
2008 songs
2009 debut singles
Songs written by Alexander Rybak
EMI Records singles
English-language Norwegian songs